Byōdō-ji (平等寺) is a Buddhist temple in Shimogyō-ku, Kyoto Prefecture, Japan. It was founded in 1003, and it is dedicated to Yakushi Nyorai. The temple is affiliated with the Shingon-shū Chizan-ha. It is also known as Inabadō or Inaba Yakushi (因幡堂、因幡薬師).

See also 
Thirteen Buddhist Sites of Kyoto

External links 
 

Buddhist temples in Kyoto Prefecture